J. Miller Leavy (August 12, 1905, Tucson, Arizona - January 1, 1995, Eagle Rock, California) was an American lawyer who achieved fame for prosecuting several high-profile cases as a district attorney in Los Angeles for 41 years. During his tenure he achieved many death penalty convictions, which led to the executions of twelve men and one woman by gas chamber.

A graduate of the University of California, Los Angeles (1927) and the University of Michigan Law School (1930), Leavy first drew national public attention for his successful prosecution of Caryl Chessman, the "Red Light Bandit", in 1947. He also successfully prosecuted Barbara Graham in 1953 for bludgeoning an elderly woman to death; a trial which was depicted in the Academy Award winning film I Want to Live! (1958). In 1957 Leavy made legal history when he became the first prosecutor in the United States to obtain a murder conviction on purely circumstantial evidence with his case against Robert Leonard Ewing Scott. He was portrayed by actor Linden Chiles in the 1976 television film Helter Skelter about Charles Manson.

References

1905 births
1995 deaths
20th-century American lawyers
District attorneys in California
University of California, Los Angeles alumni
University of Michigan Law School alumni